Eremitilla is a monotypic genus of flowering plants belonging to the family Orobanchaceae. The only species is Eremitilla mexicana.

Its native range is Southwestern Mexico.

References

Orobanchaceae
Orobanchaceae genera
Monotypic Lamiales genera